Çatak is a district of Van Province, Turkey.

Çatak may also refer to the following places in Turkey:

 Çatak, Alaca
 Çatak, Alaplı, a village in the Alaplı District of the Zonguldak Province
 Çatak, Altınyayla
 Çatak, Aziziye
 Çatak, Buldan
 Çatak, Çine, a village in Çine district of Aydın Province
 Çatak, Çorum
 Çatak, Gönen, a village
 Çatak, Hınıs
 Çatak, Ilgaz
 Çatak, Nazilli, a village in Nazilli district of Aydın Province
 Çatak, Oltu
 Çatak, Osmancık
 Çatak, Refahiye
 Çatak, Saimbeyli, a village in Saimbeyli district of Adana Province
 Çatak, Silifke, a village in Silifke district of Mersin Province

Çatak Dam is a dam in the Kastamonu Province of Turkey

Turkish toponyms